Bestiaire is a 2012 Canadian-French avant-garde nature documentary film directed by Denis Côté. The film centers on how humans and animals observe each other.

It was filmed at Parc Safari in Hemmingford, Quebec, and had its world premiere at the 2012 Sundance Film Festival. It was also shown at the 2012 Berlin Film Festival.

The film was nominated for the Jutra Award for Best Documentary Film at the 15th Jutra Awards, and the Rogers Best Canadian Film Award at the Toronto Film Critics Association Awards 2012.

References

External links

2012 films
2012 documentary films
Documentary films about nature
Canadian documentary films
French documentary films
Canadian avant-garde and experimental films
French avant-garde and experimental films
Films directed by Denis Côté
Non-narrative films
2010s avant-garde and experimental films
2010s Canadian films
2010s French films